Unai Albizua Urquijo (born 18 January 1989) is a Spanish professional footballer who plays for UE Cornellà as a central defender.

Club career
Born in Laudio/Llodio, Álava, Basque Country, Albizua joined Athletic Bilbao's youth system in 2003. He played three full seasons with the reserves in Segunda División B, captaining them to the 2013 playoffs after a third-place finish in his last.

Albizua was promoted to the first team prior to the beginning of the 2013–14 campaign. On 3 November 2013 he made his La Liga debut, coming on as a 67th-minute substitute in a 2–0 away loss against Atlético Madrid after replacing the injured Aymeric Laporte.

On 15 July 2014, Albizua was loaned to Segunda División club CD Tenerife. Roughly one year later, he moved to fellow league side CD Leganés after cutting ties with Athletic.

On 28 July 2016, Albizua signed for UCAM Murcia CF still in the second division. The following 11 July, he joined Cultural y Deportiva Leonesa from the same league.

On 17 August 2021, after one year in the Swiss Challenge League with FC Stade Lausanne Ouchy, the 32-year-old Albizua returned to Spain and signed with UE Cornellà of the newly-formed Primera División RFEF.

References

External links

1989 births
Living people
Spanish footballers
Footballers from the Basque Country (autonomous community)
Association football defenders
La Liga players
Segunda División players
Segunda División B players
Tercera División players
Primera Federación players
CD Basconia footballers
Bilbao Athletic footballers
Athletic Bilbao footballers
CD Tenerife players
CD Leganés players
UCAM Murcia CF players
Cultural Leonesa footballers
UD Ibiza players
UE Cornellà players
Swiss Challenge League players
FC Stade Lausanne Ouchy players
Spanish expatriate footballers
Expatriate footballers in Switzerland
Spanish expatriate sportspeople in Switzerland